The 14501 / 14502 Bathinda Jammu Tawi Express is an express train belonging to the Indian Railways that runs between  and  in India.

Service 
It operates as train number 14501 from Bathinda Junction to Jammu Tawi and as train number 14502 in the reverse direction, serving the state of Punjab and the union territory of Jammu and Kashmir.

Coaches

The service presently has 1 AC 3 Tier, 4 Sleeper class & 4 General Unreserved coaches are there.

As with most train services in India, coach composition may be amended at the discretion of Indian Railways depending on demand.

Routeing

Traction
As this route is partially electrified, a Ludhiana-based WDM-3A pulls the train to its destination.

See also
 Bathinda–Jammu Tawi Express (via Firozpur)

References

External links
14501 Bathinda Jammu Tawi Express at India Rail Info
14502 Jammu Tawi Bathinda Express at India Rail Info

Transport in Jammu
Transport in Bathinda
Express trains in India
Rail transport in Punjab, India
Rail transport in Jammu and Kashmir